Louise Hopkins Underwood (May 12, 1919- March 7, 2017) was an American patron of the arts who created the Louise Hopkins Underwood Center for the Arts (LHUCA) in Lubbock, Texas. She was a founding member of the Texas Alliance for Education and the Arts and a founding member of the Lubbock Cultural Arts Commission.

In 1997, together with Neal Hanslik, she co-founded the LHUCA for the purpose of having a single location for artists to do their work and teach others. The LHUCA campus attracts almost 50,000 people a year for classes, exhibitions, a clay studio, a theater and other activities.

She was married to Harris Faulkner Underwood II and raised six children with him in Lubbock, Texas.

Awards 
She received the 'Dynamic Force' award from Lubbock's Arts Alliance and the 'Champion of the Arts' award from the Texas Alliance for Education and the Arts. She was a 2008 inductee to the Texas Women's Hall of Fame. She received the George Mahon Award for Extraordinary Public Service.

References 

1919 births
2017 deaths
People from Lubbock, Texas
American patrons of the arts